Vienne-en-Bessin (literally Vienne in Bessin) is a commune in the Calvados department in the Normandy region in northwestern France.

During the latter stages of the Battle of Normandy it was the home of the British Army 59th (Staffordshire) Infantry Division's battle school.

Population

See also
Communes of the Calvados department

References

Communes of Calvados (department)
Calvados communes articles needing translation from French Wikipedia